A secure fixed term tenancy is in the United Kingdom a tenancy existing for a fixed number of years. Fixed term tenancies were introduced in the Housing and Planning Act 2016 replacing the 'lifetime' secure council tenancy for new tenancies issued.  The Housing and Planning Act 2016 allows for ten-year tenancies.

References

Generally a probationary period of one year and the tenancy reviewed after an initial 9 months. If there are no issues the tenancy is then converted to a fixed term five years. Reviewed in the final year before being beginning a further five years if the tenant(s) still meet the requirements and criteria.
However, if the initial probationary term is breached by way of arrears or anti social behaviour the period can be extended by six months before a decision is undertaken to award a five-year term or terminate the agreement.

Housing in the United Kingdom